Arthur Sherburne Hardy (August 13, 1847 – March 14, 1930) was an American engineer, educator, editor, diplomat, novelist, and poet.

Early life and education
Hardy was born in 1847 in Andover, Massachusetts, the son of Alpheus and Susan W. (Holmes) Hardy. He received his elementary school education abroad and thus gained an exposure to languages. He attended Phillips Academy and completed one year at Amherst College before becoming a cadet at the United States Military Academy at West Point in 1865, where he excelled in languages. He graduated tenth in the class of 1869 and was commissioned a second lieutenant of artillery. His first duty was as assistant instructor of artillery tactics at West Point from July 6 to August 28 in the summer of 1869. He was then stationed in Fort Jefferson in the Dry Tortugas in Florida. In this period after the Civil War, there was little chance of advancement in the Army so, after consulting with General William T. Sherman, he resigned in 1870.

Career

Hardy served as a short period as an engineer locating routes for railroads. Then he became a professor of mathematics at Grinnell College where he stayed until 1873. Then he became professor of civil engineering in the Chandler Scientific School at Dartmouth College, accepting the position on the condition that he be allowed to serve abroad for a year. He went to Paris where he followed the course of the Ecole des Ponts et Chausees as an eleve externe and simultaneously attended as many of the lectures as he could at the École des Beaux-Arts (School of Fine Arts), Sorbonne, and Conservatoire National des Arts et Métiers (National Conservatory of Crafts and Industries). In 1878 he obtained the chair of mathematics at Dartmouth and served until 1893.

According to "The Early History of the [Dartmouth] Mathematics Department 1769–1961":

While teaching at Dartmouth, Hardy helped redesign the College Park behind his house.  On his departure, he sold his house to the incoming President William Jewett Tucker (the house later became the official presidential residence, a medical laboratory, and the home of a chapter of the Delta Gamma sorority before being demolished.)

In 1893 Hardy became the editor of Cosmopolitan magazine, in which capacity he worked until 1895.

Subsequent to his academic career and publishing career, Hardy was appointed as the United States ambassador to several countries: he first served as United States Minister to Persia, from 1897 to 1899; he then served as United States Minister to Greece, from 1899 to 1901 (this post included serving as United States Ambassador to Romania and Serbia, as well). Later, he served as United States Ambassador to Switzerland, in 1901, and finally as United States Ambassador to Spain, from 1902 to 1905.

Hardy died on March 14, 1930, in Woodstock, Connecticut. He was buried at Woodstock Hill Cemetery.

Partial bibliography

Novels
But Yet a Woman (1883):  "By a hitherto unknown writer" was "regarded as the hit of season of 1883" 
The Wind of Destiny (1886)
Passe Rose (1889)
His Daughter First (1903)
Helen (1916)
No. 13 Rue du Bon Diable (1917)

Short stories
Diane and Her Friends (collection, 1914)

Children's fiction
Aurélie (1912)

Poetry
Francesca of Rimini (1878)
Dualty (1893)
Songs of Two (1900)

Nonfiction

Textbooks
Elements of Quaternions (1881)
Imaginary Quantities (1881), a translation of a French treatise by Jean-Robert Argand
New Methods in Topographical Surveying (1883)
Elements of Analytic Geometry (1889)
Elements of Calculus (1890)

Biography
Life and Letters of Joseph Hardy Neesima (1891)
Things Remembered (1923)

Notes

Sources
United States Department of State: List of ambassadors
Alexander Sherbune Hardy at the Department of State Office of the Historian
The Political Graveyard: Arthur Sherburne Hardy
Dartmouth College: The Early History of the Mathematics Department
United States Military Academy: Biography
United States Embassy in Madrid: Former U.S. Ambassadors And Presidential Representatives To Spain

Further reading
"Arthur Sherburne Hardy: Poet, Soldier, Novelist, Mathematician, Editor. Unity of His Life — The Poetry of Mathematics — Military Servitude and Grandeur — The Futility of Method and the Necessity for Experience and Suffering in Art and Literary Work — Ideas on Various Interesting Subjects"; The New York Times, November 19, 1893; p. 23.
"A. S. Hardy Dies: Former Diplomat, Ex-Minister to Persia Succumbs at 82 at His Home in Woodstock, Conn. West Point Graduate He Taught Mathematics at Dartmouth in 1878-93—Was Also Noted Author"; The New York Times, March 14, 1930; p. 16.
"Arthur Hardy, Former Envoy, Is Dead at 82: Had Been Minister to Several Countries, Professor, Army Officer and Author Famous as a Rifle Shot Helped to Establish First Golf Course at Athens"; New York Herald Tribune, March 14, 1930; p. 23.

External links

 
 
 

United States Military Academy alumni
Dartmouth College faculty
Phillips Academy alumni
1847 births
1930 deaths
Amherst College alumni
Ambassadors of the United States to Greece
Ambassadors of the United States to Romania
Ambassadors of the United States to Switzerland
Ambassadors of the United States to Spain
People from Andover, Massachusetts
Ambassadors of the United States to Iran
19th-century American diplomats
20th-century American diplomats
Military personnel from Massachusetts